Kurdish languages, a group of Northwestern Iranian languages spoken by the Kurds.

Kurdi may also refer to: 
 Jaban al-Kurdi, Sahabi of Islam
Kurdî pen name for the 19th century Kurdish poet Mustafa Bag Sahebqran
 Curdi, a now-submerged village in Goa.
 The plural form of "Kurd" in the Russian language.
 Alan Kurdi, a three-year-old Kurdish Syrian boy whose image made global headlines after he drowned in the Mediterranean Sea.
 Kurdish (disambiguation)

See also
 Kurd (disambiguation)